Green Center is an unincorporated community in Green Township, Noble County, in the U.S. state of Indiana.

History
A post office as established at Green Center in 1870, and remained in operation until it was discontinued in 1903. The community's location at the geographical center of Green Township caused the name to be selected.

Geography

References

Unincorporated communities in Noble County, Indiana
Unincorporated communities in Indiana